Vogue Nederland is the Dutch version of the American fashion and lifestyle magazine Vogue, published by Condé Nast. The magazine has been published since March 2012, which is over a hundred years later than the original Vogue, which has been published since 1892. The magazine's first cover featured the Dutch models  Romée Strijd, Ymre Stiekema and Josefien Rodermans.
The first editor in chief was Karin Sweerink who held the position till 2019 when she was appointed as editor in chief of Linda magazine. She was succeeded by Rinke Tjepkema in 2019.

Vogue Nederland is published by Hearst Magazines Nederland under license of Condé Nast Publications.

Vogue Nederland current circulation is approximately 60,000 copies.

See also
 List of Vogue Netherlands cover models

References 

Nederland
2012 establishments in the Netherlands